Kilburn Park is a London Underground station at Kilburn in the London Borough of Brent. The station is on the Bakerloo line, between Queen's Park and Maida Vale stations, and is in Travelcard Zone 2.

The station is situated on Cambridge Avenue approximately 100 m west of Kilburn High Road, shortly before it becomes Maida Vale, (A5). It is Grade II listed.

History
Kilburn Park was opened on 31 January 1915 as the temporary terminus of the Bakerloo line's extension from Paddington station towards Queen's Park. Services were extended to Queen's Park on 11 February 1915. At the extension's opening, Maida Vale station was not complete and the previous station was Warwick Avenue until 6 June 1915. The station building was designed by Stanley Heaps in a modified version of the earlier Leslie Green designed Bakerloo line stations with glazed terra cotta façades but without the large semi-circular windows at first floor level. It was one of the first London Underground stations built specifically to use escalators rather than lifts.

Transport links
Bus routes 31, 32, 206, 316, 328, school route 632 and night routes N28 and N31 serve the station. Also, it is only a short walk from Kilburn High Road Station (London Overground).

Gallery

Footnotes

References

External links

London Transport Museum Photographic Archive

Bakerloo line stations
Tube stations in the London Borough of Brent
Former London Electric Railway stations
Railway stations in Great Britain opened in 1915
Kilburn, London
Grade II listed buildings in the London Borough of Brent
Stanley Heaps railway stations